Oleh Viktorovych Lykov  (born 1 August 1973 in Dnipropetrovsk) is a Ukrainian rower.

References 
 
 

1973 births
Living people
Ukrainian male rowers
Sportspeople from Dnipro
Olympic rowers of Ukraine
Rowers at the 1996 Summer Olympics
Rowers at the 2000 Summer Olympics
Rowers at the 2004 Summer Olympics
Rowers at the 2008 Summer Olympics
Rowers at the 2012 Summer Olympics
Olympic bronze medalists for Ukraine
Olympic medalists in rowing
World Rowing Championships medalists for Ukraine
Medalists at the 2004 Summer Olympics